Powiat średzki may refer to either of two counties (powiats) in Poland:
Środa Śląska County, in Lower Silesian Voivodeship (SW Poland)
Środa Wielkopolska County, in Greater Poland Voivodeship (west-central Poland)